Chasŏng County is a county (kun) in Chagang Province, North Korea.  The city is immediately south of the Chinese-North Korean border.  Its approximate population to 7 km from the city center is 8,317.  The average altitude is 1279 feet, or 389 meters. Nearby cities and towns include Haengjangp'yong and Umnae-dong.

Administrative divisions
Chasŏng County is divided into 1 ŭp (town), 1 rodongjagu (workers' district) and 15 ri (villages):

Sources

External links

 

Counties of Chagang